The Rock and the River is a young adult historical fiction novel by Kekla Magoon, published January 6th 2009 by Aladdin.

Reception 
The Rock and the River is a Junior Library Guild book.

The book received starred reviews from Booklist, as well as a positive review from Bulletin of the Center for Children’s Books and Kirkus.

In their review, Kirkus wrote, "Magoon is unflinching in her depictions of police brutality and racism" and "offers readers a perspective that is rarely explored, showing that racial prejudices were not confined to the South and that the Civil Rights Movement was a truly national struggle."

The audiobook, narrated by Dion Graham, received a positive review from Booklist.

References 

Novels set in the 1960s
Novels set in Chicago
2009 children's books
Aladdin Paperbacks books